Kokona is a Local Government Area in Nasarawa State, Nigeria. Its headquarters are in the town of Garaku.

It has an area of 1,844 km and a population of 109,749 at the 2006 census.

The postal code of the area is 961.

References

Local Government Areas in Nasarawa State